Diocese or Archdiocese of Chełm may refer to the following ecclesiastical jurisdictions with see at Chełm (Kulm) in southeastern Poland :

 the former Roman Catholic Diocese of Chełm, Latin precursor of the suppressed Diocese of Chełm–Lublin and nominally restored as a Latin Catholic titular see
 the suppressed Ukrainian Catholic Eparchy of Chełm–Bełz
 the Archdiocese of Lublin and Chełm of the Polish Orthodox Church